Sartoris is an Italian language occupational surname for a tailor and may refer to:
Algernon Edward Sartoris (1877–1928), American diplomat
Joseph Martin Sartoris (1927), American prelate of the Roman Catholic Church
Peter Urban Sartoris (1767–1833), Swiss banker

References 

Italian-language surnames
Occupational surnames